Sunshine Plaza bus station was a bus station in Sunshine Plaza, Maroochydore. It was serviced by Sunbus services. It closed in November 2013 when replaced by conventional bus stops on Horton Parade.

References

Former bus stations
Bus stations in South East Queensland
Maroochydore
Public transport in Sunshine Coast, Queensland